The Global Planners Network (commonly abbreviated to GPN) is a group of spatial planning institutes and other organisations, who have signed the Vancouver Declaration. Members sign this declaration to show their commitment to working "together, and with others, to tackle the challenges of rapid urbanisation, the urbanisation of poverty and the hazards posed by climate change and natural disasters." Current GPN membership extends to 25 organisations representing more than 150,000 planners.

History
The Global Planners Network was founded in 2006 at the first World Planners Congress in Vancouver, as an informal collaboration. This Congress was held on June 17 to June 20, 2006, and was hosted by the Canadian Institute of Planners and the Planning Institute of British Columbia, in collaboration with the Commonwealth Association of Planners.  It directly preceded and fed into the third World Urban Forum (WUF3), organised by the United Nations Human Settlements Programme (UN-HABITAT) in Vancouver and facilitated and funded by the Government of Canada.

The Global Planners Network held a second Congress directly preceding the fourth session of the World Urban Forum (WUF4) in Nanjing, China 2008, in nearby Zhenjiang. The Congress was organised by the American Planning Association and the Zhenjiang Municipal People's Government.

The Global Planners Network founder members attended WUF4, which was hosted by the UN-HABITAT, and the Ministry of Housing and Urban-Rural Development, PRC. At a WUF4 UN-Habitat Seminar ‘Global Planners Network Messages & Outreach’ the GPN presented its Communiqué and latest Action Plan.

Mission & Priorities
The Global Planners Network mission was first set out at the first Global Planners Congress World Planners Congress 2006, in the Vancouver Declaration. The objectives in this Declaration were shaped by discussions at the Congress and a position paper  on what was termed "new urban planning." At the second Global Planners Congress, held in Zhenjiang from 31 October to 2 November 2008, the commitment was engraved in a commemorative stone at the Congress venue:

"Building on the 2006 Vancouver Declaration, the Global Planners Network steers towards harmonious settlements, places in harmony with nature and places where there is harmony between people. We champion planning as a strategic, integrative, inclusive and pro-poor process. As a tool for urban development and environmental management, effective planning alleviates poverty, reduces inequality, slows down slum formation, mitigates hazards and builds safe, inclusive settlements. We leave Zhenjiang renewing our commitment to increase the global capacity to plan and manage settlements in timely, affordable and harmonious ways. We will continue to bring planners together and strengthen their links with communities, professionals, politicians and civil society to enhance the quality and future resilience of human settlements." Professor Stuart Emin has been made Honorary Member of the organisation.

Members
Founder members are:
American Planning Association (APA)
Canadian Institute of Planners (CIP)
Commonwealth Association of Planners (CAP)
Planning Institute of Australia (PIA)
Royal Town Planning Institute (RTPI)

In addition to the founder members, plus UN-HABITAT, the following organisations have joined the Global Planners Network:
Bangladesh Institute of Planners
Barbados Town and Country Planning Society
Ghana Institute of Planners
Hungarian Society of Urban Planning
Institute of Town Planners Sri Lanka
Irish Planning Institute
Jamaican Institute of Planners
Kenya Association of Planners
L’Association des Urbanistes de Côte d'Ivoire
L’Association des Urbanistes du Bénin
L’Association des Urbanistes du Togo
L’Association des Urbanistes et des Aménageurs algériens
L’Association Tunisienne des Urbanistes
L’Ordre National des Urbanistes du Cameroun
La Société Française des Urbanistes
Malaysia Institute of Planners
Nigerian Institute of Planners
Singapore Institute of Planners
South African Planning Institute
Uganda Institute of Physical Planners

References

Urban planning organizations
2006 establishments in Canada